Rubobostes was a Dacian king in Transylvania, during the 2nd century BC.

He was mentioned in Gnaeus Pompeius Trogus's Prolegomena. Trogus wrote that during his rule, the Dacians' power increased, as they defeated the Celts who previously held the power in the region.

Trogus Pompeius and Justin mention a rise in Dacian authority under the leadership of King Rubobostes (before 168 BC) which probably suggests the end of Celtic dominance in Transylvania, that is, that they were possibly thrust out of Dacia by the growing power of an indigenous dynasty. Alternatively, some scholars have proposed that the Transylvanian Celts remained but merged into the local culture context and thus ceased to be distinctive archaeologically. It is possible that both processes were partially responsible for the disappearance of La Tène material in Romania.

Notes

References
Dicţionar de istorie veche a României ("Dictionary of Ancient Romanian History") (1976) Editura Ştiinţifică şi Enciclopedică, pp. 510
John T. Koch (2005) Celtic culture: a historical encyclopedia, Volume 1, Publisher: ABC-CLIO
Barry Cunliffe (1987)  The Celtic World, Publisher: Outlet

Dacian kings
2nd-century BC rulers in Europe